The 2016–17 Liga ASOBAL, also named Liga ASOBAL by sponsorship reasons, is the 27th season since its establishment.

Promotion and relegation 
Teams relegated to 2016–17 División de Plata
 BM Aragón (dissolved)
 SD Teucro

Teams promoted from 2015–16 División de Plata
 Bidasoa Irún
 Atlético Valladolid

Teams

League table

References

External links
Liga ASOBAL

Liga ASOBAL seasons
1
Spa